John Callahan may refer to:

 John Callahan (actor) (1953–2020), American actor; best known from the soap opera All My Children
 John Callahan (cartoonist) (1951–2010), cartoonist
 John Callahan's Quads!, a 2001 animated television series
 John Callahan (Wisconsin politician) (1865–1956), Wisconsin Superintendent of Public Instruction
 John B. Callahan (born 1969), mayor of Bethlehem, Pennsylvania and Democratic nominee for the U.S. House of Representatives
 John F. Callahan, writer and editor of numerous volumes related to African-American literature
 John H. Callahan (1845–1914), American Civil War soldier and Medal of Honor recipient
 John M. Callahan, chairman of the Democratic Party of Wisconsin
 John Ross Callahan (1853–1918), American dentist
 John Callahan (catcher) (1878–1952), American baseball player
 John Callahan (pitcher) (1874–1954), baseball player
 John Callahan (skier) (born 1962), American Olympic skier
 John Callahan (wrestler) (born 1964), American professional wrestler
 John Callahan (outlaw) (1866–1936), American outlaw and bank robber

See also
 John Callaghan (disambiguation)
 Jack Callahan (disambiguation)